Little Red River 106C is an Indian reserve of the Lac La Ronge Indian Band in Saskatchewan. It is 34 kilometres north of Prince Albert. In the 2016 Canadian Census, it recorded a population of 354 living in 88 of its 98 total private dwellings. In the same year, its Community Well-Being index was calculated at 48 of 100, compared to 58.4 for the average First Nations community and 77.5 for the average non-Indigenous community.

References

Indian reserves in Saskatchewan
Division No. 15, Saskatchewan